Yeva (in Armenian Եվա, in Persian یه‌وا) is a 2017 Armenian drama film directed by Armenian-Iranian filmmaker Anahit Abad. The joint Iranian and Armenian produced film financed by the National Cinema Center of Armenia and Iran's Farabi Cinema Foundation is Anahid Abad's first long film feature. It was selected as the Armenian entry for the Best Foreign Language Film at the 90th Academy Awards held in 2018 but it was not nominated.

Plot
After her husband's death, a young woman flees Yerevan to the Artsakh Republic with her daughter to escape her in-laws, but events follow her there.

Cast
 Narine Grigoryan
 Shant Hovhannisyan
 Marjan Avetisyan
 Rozi Avetisyan
 Mardjan Avetisyan
 Sos Janibekyan
 Vrej Kasuni
 Nanor Petrosyan

See also
 List of submissions to the 90th Academy Awards for Best Foreign Language Film
 List of Armenian submissions for the Academy Award for Best Foreign Language Film

References

External links
 

2017 films
2017 drama films
Armenian-language films
Armenian drama films